Thomas's vlei rat (Otomys thomasi) is a species of rodent in the family Muridae. It is endemic to Kenya's high plateau mountains of the Rift Valley.

Taxonomy 
Osgood (1910) initially described this species as Otomys thomasi. In 2006, it would be included under Otomys orestes (afroalpine vlei rat) by Carleton & Byrne.Taylor et al. (2011) reviewed the genus Otomys and moved Otomys thomasi back to species status.

Conservation 

It is known from less than 10 locations in Kenya and isn't recorded in protected areas, hence the assessment of the species as "Vulnerable" by the IUCN.

References

Mammals described in 1910
Mammals of Kenya
Taxa named by Wilfred Hudson Osgood